Beckton station may mean:
Beckton DLR station, Docklands Light Railway station
Beckton railway station, closed in 1940
Beckton tube station, unbuilt Jubilee line station proposed in the 1970s

Disambig-Class London Transport articles